Mossyrock Dam is a concrete arch-gravity dam on the Cowlitz River near Mossyrock in Lewis County, Washington. The reservoir created by the dam is called Riffe Lake and the primary purpose of the dam is hydroelectric production while flood control is secondary. The dam is the tallest in Washington State and its hydroelectric power station supplies 40% of Tacoma Power's electricity.

History
Planning for the Mossyrock Dam began in the 1940s but opposition from local fishers and Washington State's Fish and Wildlife Department delayed construction. During World War II, the city of Tacoma, Washington purchased its electricity from the Bonneville Power Administration and from Seattle, with costs of up to $1 million/year. To generate its own electricity, Tacoma City Light (now Tacoma Power) built several dams, including the Mossyrock Dam. Plans for the Mossyrock Dam were announced in 1948 but met stiff opposition. The Washington State Legislature enacted a fish sanctuary on the Cowlitz River that initially blocked the project. Tacoma City sued, with its suit being raised to the US Supreme Court a total of three times. After that, construction of the dam was approved. Construction began in 1965 and ended in 1968. On October 13, 1968, the dam's power plant generated its first electricity. Several towns were forced to evacuate ahead of the rising dam waters including Riffe, Nesika, and Kosmos.

Tacoma City Light originally proposed naming the facility the "Homer T. Bone Dam", in honor of Senator Homer Bone of Tacoma.

Power plant
The Mossyrock Dam's power plant contains two Francis turbine hydroelectric generators, each rated at 150 MW, or 300 MW total capacity. They are fed by three penstocks ranging from 248 – 285 feet in overall length. One of the three penstocks is presently unused, awaiting possible future installation of a third turbine.

Power plant upgrade
In 2006, GE Energy was selected to upgrade the two turbines. The $50 million project included replacing the turbines, stators, wicket gates and transformers. Installation of the first generator began in 2008; it began operation in 2009. Replacement of the second generator was completed in late 2010. The power plant upgrade increased the total capacity by 70 MW, with an expected overall energy conversion efficiency of near 95 percent.

See also
List of dams in the Columbia River watershed

References

External links

Tacoma News Tribune video of the Mossyrock Dam's power plant rebuild

Dams in Washington (state)
United States power company dams
Hydroelectric power plants in Washington (state)
Buildings and structures in Lewis County, Washington
Arch-gravity dams
Dams completed in 1968
Energy infrastructure completed in 1968
Tacoma Public Utilities